Spitzmüller is a surname. Notable people with the surname include:

 Alexander Spitzmüller (1862–1953), Austrian lawyer, bank director, and politician
 Anna Spitzmüller (1903–2001), Austrian art historian, curator, and educator
 István Spitzmüller (born 1986), Hungarian footballer